Carlos Alberto Valencia Paredes (born 28 April 1989) is a Colombian footballer who plays as a left-back for Independiente Medellín.

Career
Valencia was born in Santa Marta, Colombia. He left Colombia at the age of 15 to go and play in the River Plate youth academy. He was formed for Club Deportivo Independiente San Joaquin. His coach was José Luis Cruz (Tucumano) He initially played as an attacking midfielder, but at the age of 17 when he joined the River 1st team he was used as a left-back, and to take corners and throw ins.

He made his debut on 10 November 2007 in River's 2–1 loss to Huracán and played the full 90 minutes in his debut.

After starting two games at the end of the season for River Plate, several French clubs became interested and he eventually joined Dijon FCO.

In 2009, he returned to Argentina to play for Estudiantes de La Plata. On 17 May 2009 he came on as a substitute against Independiente in the 77th minute and then scored his first goal for the club to finish off a 5–1 win. On 11 August 2009, Valencia was signed by Godoy Cruz and on 22 December 2009 his club released the Colombian left-back. In the summer of 2010 he signed to the Portuguese Liga club Portimonense, but he was loaned to Sportivo Luqueño.

References

External links
Carlos Valencia – Argentine Primera statistics at Fútbol XXI  
River stats on argentinesoccer.com

1989 births
Living people
Sportspeople from Valle del Cauca Department
Association football defenders
Colombian footballers
Colombian expatriate footballers
Club Atlético River Plate footballers
Chacarita Juniors footballers
Estudiantes de La Plata footballers
Godoy Cruz Antonio Tomba footballers
FC Rubin Kazan players
Dijon FCO players
Sportivo Luqueño players
Deportivo Cali footballers
Atlético Huila footballers
Millonarios F.C. players
Independiente Medellín footballers
Deportes Copiapó footballers
Ligue 2 players
Primera B de Chile players
Argentine Primera División players
Expatriate footballers in Chile
Expatriate footballers in Argentina
Expatriate footballers in Paraguay
Expatriate footballers in France
Expatriate footballers in Russia
Colombian expatriate sportspeople in Chile
Colombian expatriate sportspeople in Argentina
Colombian expatriate sportspeople in Paraguay
Colombian expatriate sportspeople in France
Colombian expatriate sportspeople in Russia